Frederick Roach (1856–1922) was an Anglican bishop in South Africa in the first quarter of the 20th Century.

Roach was educated at Cheltenham Training College and ordained in 1886. He served at Kwamagwaza, Isandhlwana and Etalaneni before becoming Archdeacon of Eshowe in 1905.  In 1913 he became Assistant Bishop of Natal, a post he held until his death.

Notes

20th-century Anglican Church of Southern Africa bishops
1856 births
1922 deaths
Alumni of the University of Gloucestershire
Anglican archdeacons in Africa
Anglican bishops of Natal